Chay Kandi (also Romanized as Chāy Kandī) is a village in Yeylaq Rural District, in the Central District of Kaleybar County, East Azerbaijan Province, Iran. At the 2006 census, its population was 523, in 112 families.

References 

Populated places in Kaleybar County